"To Die For" is a song by English singer Sam Smith, released through Capitol Records on 14 February 2020. Smith co-wrote the song alongside Jimmy Napes and Stargate. The song appears on Smith's third studio album Love Goes (2020).

Background
Smith said that they wrote the song in Los Angeles "during a time of self-discovery and heartbreak".

Composition
"To Die For", a pop song, was written by Smith, Jimmy Napes, Stargate, and produced by the latter two. Running for a length of three minutes and thirteen seconds, "To Die For" is a piano-forward ballad. The song samples audio from the 2001 cult classic film Donnie Darko.

Promotion
Smith opened a pop-up wig shop named after the song in the Soho area of London, and performed the song on The Graham Norton Show on 14 February.

Music video
The music video, directed by Grant Singer, premiered on YouTube on 14 February 2020.

Track listing
Digital download/stream
"To Die For" – 3:14

Digital download/stream
"To Die For" (Acoustic) – 3:20

Digital download – Remixes EP
"To Die For" (Ólafur Arnalds Remix) – 3:30		
"To Die For" (Y2K Remix) – 2:25		
"To Die For" (Blinkie Remix) – 3:32		
"To Die For" (Madism Remix) – 2:42

Stream – Y2K remix
"To Die For" (Y2K Remix) – 2:26	

Stream – Madism Remix
"To Die For" (Madism Remix) – 2:42

Stream – Blinkie Remix
"To Die For" (Blinkie Remix) – 3:33	

Stream – Ólafur Arnalds Remix
"To Die For" (Ólafur Arnalds Remix) – 3:30

Credits and personnel
Credits adapted from Tidal.

 Jimmy Napes – songwriter, producer
 Stargate – songwriter, producer
 Sam Smith – songwriter, vocals
 Mikkel S. Eriksen – programming
 Kevin KD Davis – mixer, studio personnel
 Randy Merrill – mastering engineer, studio personnel

Charts

Weekly charts

Year-end charts

Certifications

Release history

References

2020 singles
2020 songs
2020s ballads
Sam Smith (singer) songs
Songs written by Sam Smith (singer)
Songs written by Tor Erik Hermansen
Song recordings produced by Stargate (record producers)
Pop ballads
Songs written by Mikkel Storleer Eriksen
Songs written by Jimmy Napes